This is a list of the records of all the managers of Huddersfield Town since the club's inception in 1908.

Statistics
Information correct as of matches played up to and including 18 March 2023. Only competitive matches are counted.

Managers with honours

References

99 Years & Counting – Stats & Stories – Huddersfield Town History

Managers
 
Huddersfield Town